A Special Night with Demi Lovato was the second headlining concert tour and first world tour by American singer Demi Lovato, in support of her third studio album Unbroken (2011).

Background
Launched in November 2011, the first leg consisted of 19 shows made up of both headlining concerts and winter festivals. As it ventured into 2012, the trek mostly consisted of appearances at radio festivals and state fairs during February and March. In April 2012 Lovato embarked on a South American leg, playing a total of 10 shows. The second leg in North America, and the third leg in total became known as the Summer Tour 2012, consisting of 25 shows across North and South America. In 2013, the tour was expanded to promote "Heart Attack" which is the lead single of her fourth studio album, Demi. The tour played over 70 shows in the Americas, Asia and Europe. The concert tour has been praised by music critics for Lovato's performances and vocals. The concert was nominated for a Billboard Touring award and won a Capricho Award for Best Concert.

Broadcast and recordings
Lovato's journey through the first US leg of the tour was documented as a part of her television documentary Demi Lovato: Stay Strong which aired on MTV in 2012. The film followed Lovato through the tour, showing exclusive behind the scenes moments and highlighting Demi's journey through her recovery on her first tour since leaving rehab earlier in 2011.

Opening acts
 Hot Chelle Rae (North America–2012, select dates)
 Owl City (North America–2012, select dates)
 Neon Hitch (Los Angeles, Camden)
 We the Kings (North America—2012, select dates)
 College 11 (São Paulo and Rio de Janeiro)
 Danna Paola (Mexico City and Monterrey)
 Khalil Ramos (Manila)

Setlist

Tour dates

Festivals and other miscellaneous performances

Cancellations and rescheduled shows

Notes

References

2011 concert tours
2012 concert tours
2013 concert tours
Demi Lovato concert tours